The Philadelphia Phillies are a Major League Baseball team based in Philadelphia, Pennsylvania. They  are a member of the Eastern Division of Major League Baseball's National League. The team has played officially under two names since beginning play in 1883: the current moniker, as well as the "Quakers", which was used in conjunction with "Phillies" during the team's early history. The team was also known unofficially as the "Blue Jays" during the World War II era. Since the franchise's inception,  players have made an appearance in a competitive game for the team, whether as an offensive player (batting and baserunning) or a defensive player (fielding, pitching, or both).

Of those  Phillies, 143 have had surnames beginning with the letter C. Two of those players have been inducted into the Baseball Hall of Fame: pitcher Steve Carlton, who pitched for Philadelphia from 1972 to 1986; and first baseman Roger Connor, who appeared for the Phillies in the 1892 season. The Hall of Fame lists the Phillies as Carlton's primary team, and he is a member of the Philadelphia Baseball Wall of Fame, as are right fielders Johnny Callison and Gavvy Cravath. The Phillies have also retired Carlton's number 32, the only player on this list so honored. Carlton holds two franchise records, leading all Phillies pitchers with 241 victories and 3,031 strikeouts.

Among the 78 batters in this list, catcher Harry Cheek and shortstop Todd Cruz have the highest batting average, at .500; each recorded two hits in four career at-bats. Other players with an average above .300 include Ben Chapman (.308 in two seasons), Billy Consolo (.400 in one season), Duff Cooley (.308 in four seasons), Ed Cotter (.308 in one season), and Midre Cummings (.303 in one season). Callison's 185 home runs lead all players on this list, as do Cravath's 676 runs batted in.

Of this list's 66 pitchers, two—Milo Candini and Steve Comer—have undefeated win–loss records: Candini with a 2–0 mark; and Comer with one victory and no defeats. Carlton's franchise-record 241 wins lead all pitchers on this list, as do his 161 losses. Mitch Chetkovich is the only member of this list with an earned run average (ERA) of 0.00, allowing no runs in three innings pitched. Among pitchers who have allowed earned runs, Harry Coveleski has the best average (2.09). Carlton's strikeout total of 3,031 is the most among all Phillies pitchers.

One player, Bert Conn, has made 30% or more of his Phillies appearances as a pitcher and a position player. He amassed an 0–3 pitching record with a 7.77 ERA while batting .267 with three extra-base hits and seven runs scored.

Footnotes
Key
 The National Baseball Hall of Fame and Museum determines which cap a player wears on their plaque, signifying "the team with which he made his most indelible mark". The Hall of Fame considers the player's wishes in making their decision, but the Hall makes the final decision as "it is important that the logo be emblematic of the historical accomplishments of that player’s career".
 Players are listed at a position if they appeared in 30% of their games or more during their Phillies career, as defined by Baseball-Reference. Additional positions may be shown on the Baseball-Reference website by following each player's citation.
 Franchise batting and pitching leaders are drawn from Baseball-Reference. A total of 1,500 plate appearances are needed to qualify for batting records, and 500 innings pitched or 50 decisions are required to qualify for pitching records.
 Statistics are correct as of the end of the 2010 Major League Baseball season.

List
 Ron Clark is listed by Baseball-Reference as a third baseman, shortstop, and second baseman, but never appeared in a game in the field for the Phillies.

References
General

Inline citations

C